This is a list of notable people with the surname Berlin.
 Abby Berlin, American filmmaker
 Ben Berlin (1896–1944), Estonian jazz musician
 Boris Berlin (1907–2001), Canadian pianist, music educator, arranger, and composer
 Brent Berlin (born 1936), American anthropologist
 Brigid Berlin (1939–2020), American painter
 Brock Berlin (born 1981), American football quarterback
 Dash Berlin (born 1979), Dutch DJ
 Elaine May (born 1932) née Elaine Iva Berlin, American comedian, filmmaker, comedian, and actress
 Eve Berlin or Yves Berlin, bassist for St. Louis rock band Living Things
 Grace Berlin (1897–1982), American ecologist, ornithologist and historian
 Greta Berlin (born 1941), American pro-Palestinian activist 
 Irving Berlin (1888–1989), Russian-born American composer
 Isaac Berlin (1867-1934), British stage actor as Ivan Berlyn
 Isaiah Berlin (1909–1997), Russian empire-born British social and political theorist, philosopher, and historian of ideas
 Isaiah Berlin (rabbi) (1725–1799), Hungary-born German Talmudic critic
 Jeannie Berlin (born 1949), American actor 
 Jeff Berlin (born 1953), American musician
 Lillian Berlin (born 1982), lead singer for St. Louis rock band Living Things
 Lucia Berlin (1936-2004), an American short story writer
 Naftali Zvi Yehuda Berlin (1817–1893), Russian rabbi
 Nahman Berlin, German writer
 Per Berlin (1921–2011), Swedish wrestler
 Saul Berlin (1740–1794), German Jewish scholar and supporter of the enlightenment
 Sven Berlin (1911–1999), British painter, fiction writer, and sculptor
 Theodore H. Berlin (1917–1962), American theoretical physicist
 Violet Berlin (born 1968), Turkish-born English television presenter
 William M. Berlin (1880–1962), American politician

German-language surnames
Jewish surnames